HMAS Potrero was an auxiliary vessel operated by the Royal Australian Navy (RAN) during World War II. She was launched in 1937 by Lars Halvorsen, Neutral Bay, Sydney, Australia.

Operational history

During World War II, HMAS Potrero operated along the New Guinea coastline. On 29 August 1942, the Imperial Japanese Navy submarine  torpedoed the motor vessel  while Malaita was returning to Cairns, Queensland, Australia, after delivering troops and supplies to Port Moresby, New Guinea. Although listing 10 degrees to starboard, Malaita remained afloat, and was taken in tow by the motor vessel  and HMAS Potrero. Their escort, the destroyer , picked up an asdic contact on Ro-33, and delivered a series of depth-charge attacks that sank her.

Citations

References
 

1937 ships
Shipwrecks of the Far South Coast Region